John C. Calhoun (1782–1850) was a U.S. senator from South Carolina from 1845 to 1850. Senator Calhoun may also refer to:

Bob Calhoun (1937-2020), Virginia State Senate
Charles Calhoun Jr. (1931–2014), Texas State Senate
James Calhoun (politician, born 1802) (1802–1852), Georgia State Senate
Riemer Calhoun (1909–1994), Louisiana State Senate
William B. Calhoun (1796–1865), Massachusetts State Senate